The 2002 Ugandan Super League was the 35th season of the official Ugandan football championship, the top-level football league of Uganda.

Overview
The 2002 Uganda Super League was contested by 15 teams and was won by SC Villa, while SCOUL, Maji FC, Nile FC/Military Police, Arua Garage and Kasese Town Council FC were relegated.

League standings

Leading goalscorer
The top goalscorer in the 2002 season was Hassan Mubiru of Express FC with 22 goals.

Footnotes

External links
Uganda - List of Champions - RSSSF (Hans Schöggl)
Ugandan Football League Tables - League321.com

Ugandan Super League seasons
1
Uganda
Uganda